Gabor S. Boritt (born 1940 in Budapest, Hungary) is an American historian.  He was the Robert Fluhrer Professor of Civil War Studies and Director of the Civil War Institute at Gettysburg College.  Born and raised in Hungary, he participated as a teenager in the Hungarian Revolution of 1956 against the Soviet Union before escaping to America, where he received his higher education and became a scholar of Abraham Lincoln and the American Civil War.  He is the author, co-author, or editor of 16 books about Lincoln or the War.  Boritt received the National Humanities Medal in 2008 from President George W. Bush.

Early life

Boritt was born to a Jewish family in Budapest, Hungary at the start of World War II.  The Nazis forced his family to live in a single room in a hospital on the ghetto's edge, where he played on bloodstained floors.  As his father helped lead resistance against the Nazis, his grandfather's family was deported from the countryside and murdered in Auschwitz.  By the end of the war, Budapest was in ruins and Hungary in Stalin's grip. In the years that followed, Boritt's mother died, his father and brother were imprisoned, and he was sent to an orphanage.  In 1956 sixteen-year-old Boritt joined the 1956 Hungarian Revolution.  He remembers the initial euphoria: "We thought it was a whole new world. Anything was possible."  Days later, 3,000 Soviet tanks crushed those possibilities, and Boritt and his sister Judith headed for the Austrian border.  In darkness, they hiked through wooded hills before coming to a no-man's-land guarded by watchtowers with machine guns. Freedom lay on the other side. Together, they started running.

Escape to America

After months at an Austrian refugee camp, Boritt came to the U.S. with just one dollar in his pocket, arriving in the "dirtiest city" he had ever seen: New York City.  Told that the real America is "out west," Boritt headed to South Dakota.  Wanting to learn English, he picked up a free booklet of Abraham Lincoln's writings.  Captivated by Lincoln's mastery of the language and his rise from poverty to the presidency, Boritt began studying American history and earned his bachelor of arts degree from Yankton College in 1962 and a master's degree from the University of South Dakota in 1963, followed by a Ph.D. from Boston University in 1968.

As an immigrant, he felt obliged to go to Vietnam, where he taught soldiers about the American Civil War.  In 1978 after deciding to pursue the study of Lincoln from the economic angle, he published his first book Lincoln and the Economics of the American Dream, which placed what Boritt called "the right to rise" at the center of Lincoln's outlook.  One of a handful of books on Lincoln published in the 1970s, a 1995 survey of leading experts by Civil War Times lists it as one of the 10 most important books ever written about Lincoln.

Gettysburg College
After teaching at the University of Michigan, in 1981 Boritt came to Gettysburg College, founding the Civil War Institute, where the school created for him the nation's first fully funded chair for the study of the Civil War. He helped create the $50,000 Lincoln Prize, widely considered the most coveted award for the study of American history. He also helped create the Gilder Lehrman Institute, which is focused on improving the teaching of history in schools.

Modern accomplishments

Boritt served on the boards of the Gettysburg National Battlefield Museum Foundation and the Abraham Lincoln Bicentennial Commission, appointed by Congress.  His book The Gettysburg Gospel: The Lincoln Speech Nobody Knows (2006) was featured on the cover of U.S. News & World Report and called "fascinating" by the New York Times.  In September 2008 Boritt gave a tour of the Gettysburg battlefield to President George W. Bush, Laura Bush and a group including White House Advisor Karl Rove, Former Attorney General Alberto Gonzalez, and Secretary of Education Margaret Spellings.

On November 17, 2008 President George W. Bush awarded Boritt the National Humanities Medal from the National Endowment for the Humanities "for a distinguished career of scholarship on Abraham Lincoln and the Civil War era.  His life's work and his life's story stand as testaments to our nation's precious legacy of liberty."  His life story is the subject of a feature-length documentary film titled Budapest to Gettysburg (2007), directed by his son Jake Boritt.   In 2009 he retired.

Gabor Boritt was inducted as a Laureate of The Lincoln Academy of Illinois and awarded the Order of Lincoln (the State’s highest honor) by the Governor of Illinois in 2009 as a Bicentennial Laureate. In 1996, Boritt received The Lincoln Forum's Richard Nelson Current Award of Achievement.

Boritt and his wife Liz live in an 18th-century farmhouse on the edge of the Gettysburg battlefield which they restored with their own hands. It served as both a stop on the Underground Railroad and as a Confederate hospital.  Together they have raised three sons: Beowulf Boritt is a set designer (and streaming video ad star) in New York City, Jake Boritt is a filmmaker who lives in Harlem, and Daniel Boritt is a biologist specializing in birds who lives in Indianapolis, Indiana.

Works
 Lincoln and the Economics of the American Dream (1978) (ASIN B010TTIP5I),
 Changing the Lincoln Image (1985) (with Harold Holzer and Mark E. Neely, Jr.) (ASIN B001Q90WOI)
 Lincoln, The War President: The Gettysburg Lectures (1992) (with Robert V. Bruce)
 Why the Confederacy Lost (1992)  (ASIN B0099L2F9A)
 Lincoln's Generals (1995)
 War Comes Again: Comparative Vistas on the Civil War and World War II (with David Eisenhower)
 The Historian's Lincoln: Pseudohistory, Psychohistory, and History (1996)
 The Gettysburg Nobody Knows (1997)
 Jefferson Davis's Generals (1999)
 The Lincoln Enigma: The Changing Faces of an American Icon (2002)
 The Lincoln Image: Abraham Lincoln and the Popular Print (2005) 
 The Gettysburg Gospel: The Lincoln Speech Nobody Knows (2006)
 Slavery, Resistance, Freedom (2009)
 The Will of God Prevails: Meditations on God and the Gettysburg Address (2014)

See also
Civil War Institute at Gettysburg College
Lincoln Prize
Gilder Lehrman Institute of American History
Gettysburg College

References

This article is partly based on the documentary film, Budapest to Gettysburg.

External links
 Budapest to Gettysburg
 The Gettysburg Gospel
 New York Times OpEd Radio Free Lincoln
 Gettysburg College Civil War Institute
 Abraham Lincoln Bicentennial Commission
 President Bush Awards 2008 National Humanities Medals
 N.E.H. detailed profile 
 Interview on The Gettysburg Gospel at the Pritzker Military Museum & Library

1940 births
Hungarian emigrants to the United States
Gettysburg College faculty
University of South Dakota alumni
Boston University alumni
21st-century American historians
21st-century American male writers
Jewish American historians
Historians of the American Civil War
Living people
National Humanities Medal recipients
Yankton College alumni
American male non-fiction writers
21st-century American Jews